Alcañiz Club de Fútbol is a Spanish football team based in Alcañiz, in the autonomous community of Aragón. Founded in 1923, it plays in Regional Preferente, holding home matches at Ciudad Deportiva Santa María, with a 2,800-seat capacity.

Season to season

25 seasons in Tercera División

External links
Futbolaragon.com profile 

Football clubs in Aragon
Association football clubs established in 1923
Divisiones Regionales de Fútbol clubs
1923 establishments in Spain